Ranzanico is a comune (municipality) in the Province of Bergamo in the Italian region of Lombardy, located about  northeast of Milan and about  northeast of Bergamo. 

Ranzanico borders the following municipalities: Bianzano, Endine Gaiano, Gandino, Monasterolo del Castello, Peia, Spinone al Lago.

References